The Municipality of Rogatec is a municipality in eastern Slovenia, on the border with Croatia. The seat of the municipality is the town of Rogatec. The area belongs to the traditional region of Styria. It is now included in the Savinja Statistical Region. The municipality was established in its current form on 3 October 1994, when the former larger Municipality of Šmarje pri Jelšah was subdivided into the municipalities of Kozje, Podčetrtek, Rogaška Slatina, Rogatec, and Šmarje pri Jelšah.

Settlements
In addition to the municipal seat of Rogatec, the municipality also includes the following settlements:

 Brezovec pri Rogatcu
 Dobovec pri Rogatcu
 Donačka Gora
 Log
 Sveti Jurij
 Tlake
 Trlično
 Žahenberc

References

External links

 Municipality of Rogatec website
 Municipality of Rogatec on Geopedia

 
Rogatec
1994 establishments in Slovenia
Rogatec